Patriarch Maximus V or Patriarch Maximos V  may refer to:

 Maximus V of Constantinople,  Ecumenical Patriarch in 1946–1948
 Maximos V Hakim, Melkite Greek Catholic Patriarch in 1967–2000

See also
 Patriarch (disambiguation)
 Maximus (disambiguation)